Rukn al-Dīn Mesud ibn Kilij Arslan or Mesud I (Modern  or Masud was the sultan of the Sultanate of Rûm from 1116 until his death in 1156.

Reign
Following the defeat and death of his father Kilij Arslan fighting against Ridwan of Aleppo at the battle of Khabur river in 1107, Mesud lost the throne in favor of his brother Malik Shah. With the help of the Danishmends, Mesud captured Konya and defeated Malik Shah in 1116, later blinding and eventually murdering him. Mesud would later turn on the Danishmends and he conquer some of their lands. In 1130, he started construction of the Alâeddin Mosque in Konya, which was later completed in 1221.

Mesud, toward the end of his reign, fought against the armies of the Second Crusade, one led by Emperor Conrad III of Germany and the other led by King Louis VII of France. Mesud defeated both of them; the first at the battle of Dorylaeum near modern Eskişehir in 1147 and the second army in Laodicea near modern Denizli in 1148.

Emperor Manuel I Komnenos persuaded Mesud I to attack Thoros II and demand his submission to the Sultan's suzerainty. However, the ensuing Seljuk attack, which in fact was provoked by an Armenian raid into Seljuk lands in Cappadocia in the winter of 1154, was routed successfully by Thoros in collaboration with a contingent of the Knights Templar.

When he died, Mesud was succeeded by his son Kilij Arslan II.

Kamero, one of Mesud's daughters married John Tzelepes Komnenos, a member of the royal house of Komnenos who had converted to Islam.

See also 
Battle of Mount Cadmus

References

Sultans of Rum
1156 deaths
Year of birth unknown
Muslims of the Second Crusade
Seljuk dynasty